Rheumatobates is a genus of water striders in the family Gerridae. There are more than 30 described species in Rheumatobates.

Species
These 39 species belong to the genus Rheumatobates:

 Rheumatobates aestuarius Polhemus, 1969
 Rheumatobates bergrothi Meinert, 1895
 Rheumatobates bonariensis (Berg, 1898)
 Rheumatobates carvalhoi Drake & Harris, 1944-01
 Rheumatobates citatus Drake & Hottes, 1951
 Rheumatobates clanis Drake & Harris, 1932
 Rheumatobates crassifemur Esaki, 1926
 Rheumatobates creaseri Hungerford, 1936
 Rheumatobates crinitus Herring, 1949-01
 Rheumatobates curracis Drake & Carvalho, 1954
 Rheumatobates drakei Hungerford, 1954
 Rheumatobates hamatus Drake & Chapman, 1954
 Rheumatobates hungerfordi Wiley, 1923
 Rheumatobates imitator (Uhler, 1894)
 Rheumatobates klagei Schroeder, 1931
 Rheumatobates longisetosus J.Polhemus & Manzano, 1992-01
 Rheumatobates mangrovensis (China, 1943)
 Rheumatobates meinerti Schroeder, 1931
 Rheumatobates mexicanus Drake & Hottes, 1951
 Rheumatobates minimus Drake, 1958-01
 Rheumatobates minutus Hungerford, 1936
 Rheumatobates ornatus J.Polhemus & Cheng, 1977
 Rheumatobates palosi Blatchley, 1926
 Rheumatobates pecularis Polhemus & Spangler
 Rheumatobates peculiaris J.Polhemus & Spangler, 1989-27
 Rheumatobates petilus Drake & Hottes, 1951
 Rheumatobates plumipes Castro-Vargas & Morales-Castaño, 2011-23
 Rheumatobates praeposterus Bergroth, 1908
 Rheumatobates probolicornis J.Polhemus & Manzano, 1992-01
 Rheumatobates prostatus J.Polhemus, 1975
 Rheumatobates rileyi Bergroth, 1892
 Rheumatobates spinosus Hungerford, 1954
 Rheumatobates tenuipes Meinert, 1895
 Rheumatobates trinitatis (China, 1943)
 Rheumatobates trinitatus (China, 1943)
 Rheumatobates trulliger Bergroth, 1915
 Rheumatobates urabaensis Molano, Mondragón & Morales, 2017-16
 Rheumatobates vegatus Drake & Harris, 1942
 Rheumatobates wrighti Drake & Harris

References

Further reading

 

Rhagadotarsinae
gerromorpha genera
Articles created by Qbugbot